Jafarabad (also Romanized as Ja’farābād) is a village in Mokriyan-e Shomali Rural District, in the Central District of Miandoab County, West Azerbaijan Province, Iran. At the 2006 census, its population was 217, in 54 families.

References 

Populated places in Miandoab County